For many years, North America was the largest exporter of uranium ore in the world and has been a major world producer since demand for uranium developed.  In 2009 Kazakhstan took over top spot, relegating Canada to second.  20% of the world's primary uranium production came from mines in Canada in 2009.  14.5% of the world production came from one mine, McArthur River.  Currently the only producing area in Canada is northern Saskatchewan, although other areas have had active mines in the past.

History

Discovery of uranium 
Canada's first recorded discovery of uranium came in the 1930s 3 when prospector Gilbert LaBine discovered pitchblende, a major uranium bearing mineral, on the shores of the Great Bear Lake in the Northwest Territories.  This discovery led Labine's company, Eldorado Gold Mines Limited, to develop the Eldorado Mine at Port Radium, Northwest Territories in 1932 and a refinery to extract Radium from the ore in Port Hope, Ontario, the following year.

Post World War II demand 
During World War II, the demand for uranium exploded as the United States and its allies, Britain and Canada, began the Manhattan Project to produce the first atomic weapons. As a result, in 1943 the Government of Canada expropriated the assets of Eldorado and formed a federal crown corporation, Eldorado Mining and Refining Limited, to oversee Canadian uranium assets.  Exploration for uranium was restricted to Eldorado and the Geological Survey of Canada.

The ban on private prospecting was lifted in 1947.  This led to an exploration boom that quickly resulted in the discovery of mines in the Northwest Territories (Rayrock), Ontario (Bancroft and Elliot Lake), and Saskatchewan (Uranium City).  By 1956, thousands of radioactive occurrences had been noted and by 1959, 23 mines were in operation in five districts.  In 1959, Canadian uranium exports were valued at $330 million, more than for any other mineral exported from Canada that year.  In the early 1960s, military demand for uranium declined and in 1965 Canada imposed a policy of only selling uranium for peaceful purposes.  This period marked the end of the first uranium boom and saw the number of operating mines drop to four.  To assist the domestic uranium industry, the federal government initiated a stockpiling program to purchase uranium.  This program ended in 1974 when demand for uranium for power generation was sufficient to support the industry.

Mine safety 

Poor working conditions in Elliot Lake mines led to the 1974 Elliot Lake miners strike, which prompted the government to initiate the Royal Commission on the Health and Safety of Workers in Mines. Recommendations from the royal commission influenced occupational safety legislation for mines and other industries to this day.

Uranium mining by province

Nova Scotia
A moratorium on uranium exploration was declared in the province of Nova Scotia in 1984. This moratorium expired on January 1, 1995. However, Nova Scotia has since enacted legislation making uranium exploration and mining illegal.

Quebec
On March 28, 2013, Quebec became the third province in Canada to impose a moratorium on uranium development. This ban appears to be temporary.

Ontario

Uranium was first discovered in the area of Cardiff, Ontario in 1922 by W. M. Richardson at a location first called "the Richardson deposit" and later known as "the Fission property". Between 1929 and 1931, attempts were made to extract radon from the uranium ore.

In 1943, in the aftermath of World War II, as global interest in mining uranium escalated, the government sent geologists, who concluded at the time that they were not viable due to accessibility, size and uranium concentration.

1948 saw an increase in private staking for uranium in Ontario, but due to the difficulties in extracting uranium from lower grade ore, none developed into mines. In 1953 "intelligence prospecting and excellent preliminary explorations" by G. W. Burns and R. J. Steele discovered the Central Lake deposits (which later were developed into Bicroft Mine) and Arthur Shore (whose prospect became the Faraday Mine) led the way successful prospecting.

Messrs. Burns, Steele and Shore were three of one hundred area prospects were established in the Bancroft area between 1953 and 1956. At the same time, another ten mines were started in the Elliot Lake area.

Decommissioned mines at Elliot Lake and Agnew Lake area 
 Stanleigh Mine (1956–1960 and 1982–1996)
 Spanish American Mine (1957–1959)
 Can-Met Mine (1957–1960)
 Milliken Mine (1957–1964)
 Panel Mine (1957–1961 and 1978–1990)
 Denison Mine (1957–1992)
 Stanrock Mine (1958–1960 and 1964–1985)
 Quirke Mine(s) (1955–1961 and 1965–1990)
 Pronto Mine (1955–1970)
 Buckles Mine (1956–1960)
 Lacnor Mine "Lake Nordic" (1956–1960)
 Nordic Mine (1956–1970)
 Agnew Lake Mine (1977–1983)

Decommissioned mines in Bancroft area 
 Faraday/Madawaska Mine (1954–1964 and 1975–1982)
 Bicroft Mine (1967–1963)
Greyhawk Mine (1957–1959 and 1976–1982)
Dyno Mine (1958–1960)

Saskatchewan

Past producers 
Key Lake
Cluff Lake mine
Rabbit Lake Mine
Beaverlodge district
Gunnar Mine
Lorado Mine
Eldorado, Beaverlodge Operation (Ace, Fay, etc.)
Cinch Lake Mine

Current Mines 

 McArthur River uranium mine
 McClean Lake mine
 Cigar Lake Mine

British Columbia
In 1980 the province of British Columbia introduced a seven-year ban on uranium mining and exploration, which was not renewed.  In 2008, the government established a "no registration reserve" under the Mineral Tenure Act for uranium and thorium.  This excludes uranium and thorium from any mineral licences in the province.  The government has also stated that they will "ensure that all uranium deposits will remain undeveloped".

Northwest Territories

Past Producers 

 Eldorado Mine (1932–1940 and 1943–1960)
 Rayrock Mine (1957–1959)

Tailings 
In 2016, there were 217,817,839 tonnes of uranium tailings in Canada. About 201 million tonnes were located at decommissioned uranium mining sites and about 17 million tonnes were located at active sites. The inventory or uranium tailings were held as follows:

 99.4 million tonnes (46%) Rio Algom 
 69.6 million tonnes (32%) Dennison Mines
 30.9 million tonnes (14%) Cameco 
 5.2 million tonnes (2%) Orano Canada
 4.7 million tonnes (2%) Saskatchewan Research Council
 4.6 million tonnes (2%) EWL Management Limited (since 2022, merged into Ovintiv)
 2.0 million tonnes (1%) Barrick Gold
 0.5 million tonnes (0%) Ministry of Energy, Northern Development and Mines

See also
Nuclear power
Manhattan Project
Anti-nuclear movement in Canada
Canada's Deadly Secret: Saskatchewan Uranium and the Global Nuclear System (2007 book)

References

External links

 Impacts of Uranium Mining at Port Radium, NWT, Canada.

 
History of mining in Canada